Anfield is a Liverpool City Council ward in the Liverpool Walton Parliamentary constituency.

The ward was created in 1900 with a single councillor elected in that year, a second was elected in 1901 and a third in 1902. The boundary of the ward has been altered in 1953, 1973, 1980 and finally in 2004.

The ward contains Anfield Cemetery, Stanley Park and Anfield Stadium. In 2004 the ward was  slightly enlarged and the current ward boundaries are Walton Lane to the west; the Canada Dock Branch Line to the north; roughly Townsend Lane, Lower Breck Road and Rocky Lane to the east; and Walton Breck Road, Oakfield Road and Belmont Road to the south.

Councillors
By-elections have been held on 7 May 1987 (alongside an ordinary election) when Paul Downes vacated his seat and on 18 November 2021 following the death of Cllr Ros Groves who had successfully defended her seat at the May 2021 elections.

 indicates seat up for re-election after boundary changes.

 indicates seat up for re-election.

 indicates change in affiliation.

 indicates seat up for re-election after casual vacancy.

Election results

Elections of the 2020s

Elections of the 2010s

Elections of the 2000s 

After the boundary change of 2004 the whole of Liverpool City Council faced election. Three Councillors were returned at this election.

Elections of the 1990s

Elections of the 1980s 

After the boundary change of 1980 the whole of Liverpool City Council faced election. Three Councillors were returned at this election.

• italics denotes the sitting councillor
• bold denotes the winning candidate

See also
 Liverpool City Council
 Liverpool City Council elections 1880–present
 Liverpool Town Council elections 1835 - 1879

External links
Ward Profile

References

Wards of Liverpool